Kut-e Abdollah (also Romanized as Kūt-e-Abdollāh, Kūt ‘Abdollāh, Kūt Abdullah, Kūt-e-‘Abd Allāh, and Kūt-e ‘Abdollāh) is a former village in the Central District of Karun County, Khuzestan Province, Iran. At the 2006 census, its population was 8,170, in 1,518 families. On 23 January 2013, the village was merged with Khazami, Darvishabad, Shariati-ye Yek, Kut-e Navaser, Kuy-e Montazeri, Gavmishabad, Gondamakar and Hadiabad into the city of Kut-e Abdollah.

References 

Former populated places in Karun County